2022 Gran Turismo D1 Grand Prix series is the 22nd season of D1 Grand Prix started from April 24 on Fuji Speedway and ended on November 6 on Ebisu Circuit.

Naoki Nakamura entered the season as the Defending Champion.

Masashi Yokoi won his third championship with Masato Kawabata winning the Tanso (Solo Run) championship.

Regulation Changes 
In an attempt to reduce grip D1GP now only permitted tires that met the UN/ECE R117-02 international standard for wet performance, noise and rolling resistance. The grip reduction is implemented in order to decrease damaged cause by tires to the road surfaces and also to increase tire choices. The tires that will be used will undergo an inspection before being able to be use in competition.

As of result of the regulation change Linglong and Sailun could not provide tires that meet the requirements and force to pull out from competition.

Following dispute over a pit time limit in Autopolis, the time given to fix car between the battle now limited to 3 minutes with an official holding a countdown as the car being repaired.

Schedule

Changes 

 Fuji Speedway return to the calendar after last held D1GP event in 2016.The competition will be held alongside Motor Fan Festa with the Qualifying and Top 16 held on Saturday and Top 8 onwards held the following day.
 The Ebisu event will now be held on the West Course, which previously used in 2020.  The former South Course has been converted to rally style gravel and not suitable for drifting.
 Ebisu Circuit will also host the last two rounds of the season with a newly finished banked corner on its West Course, making it the third different layout in the Ebisu Circuit complex.
 Okuibuki Motorpark will only hold two rounds as supposed to the four of the previous season.

Drivers and Teams 
Entry list as of round 8 and 9

Changes 

 Linglong Tire and Sailun Tires withdraw as tyre supplier for this season as they could not comply with the 2022 tyre regulation. As of results Team Orange who have Linglong as title sponsor compete full time in Formula Drift Japan instead, but later Kanta Yanaguida who acquired D1GP license by winning twice in D1 Lights the previous year will compete for the team with Yokohama tires,  Akinori Utsumi would not compete in D1GP for the first time since 2001, Kazumi Takahashi will only compete in Formula Drift Japan following Sailun withdrawal while Seimi Tanaka and Yusuke Kitaoka changes tyre maker to Vitour.
 Shibata Racing changes tyre maker to their own in-house built tire Shibatire working together with Rydanz with Masakazu Hashi joining the team as second driver.
 Yokohama return as tyre supplier for Daigo Saito and Takahiro Ueno after last supplying tires in 2016 season.
 Despite using Yokohama during Exhibition event in 2022 Tokyo Auto Salon Masashi Yokoi and DMAX remain using Nankang but no longer became team's title sponsor
Sayaka Shimoda joined the competition and became the first female driver to compete in D1GP since Michie Mimoto in 2015
Hiroki Vito graduate to D1GP after winning D1 Lights the previous year
 Teruyoshi Iwai changes tyre supplier from Vitour to Federal.
 Tetsura Nakata return to D1GP after missing the whole 2021 season.
 Fat Five Racing changes its entry name to Trail Motor Apex Racing and at same time collaborating with Team Vertex and Naoki Nakamura but due to schedule clash with Formula Drift Japan they miss the first round.
 Naoki Nakamura replace his S15 Silvia with V8 powered S13 Silvia but due to engine issue during testing he reuse the S15 for the opening round.Team Toyo Tires will debut the new Toyota GR86 build by Wisteria and will be driven by Masato Kawabata and Hideyuki Fujino.
 Katsuhiro Ueo replace S15 Silvia to 180SX which he use in Formula Drift Japan the previous year.
 Tai Xiao-Hsang became the first non-Japanese driver to compete in series since Charles Ng and Daychapon Toyingcharoen in 2019
 Yokohama TOYOPET X 俺だっ!レーシング will only compete in final two round of the season with Tsuyoshi Tezuka returning since last competing in 2017 and will use Yokohama tyres.
 Mitsuru Murakami misses the final two round of the season to focus on next year of the competition.

Ranking

Overall Drivers' Ranking 

Note :

† : Naoki Nakamura gets second place but according to the regulation due to his rear tire debeaded he did not awarded any point

* : Due to debris flying and injured one of the spectator the event were not continued and as per regulation the Top 4 were given the same point (excluding Tanso point) and the winner is given to the highest     quailifier

Solo Run Ranking

Teams' Ranking

Points System 

Note :

† : Naoki Nakamura gets second place but according to the regulation due to his rear tire debeaded he did not awarded any point

* : Due to debris flying and injured one of the spectator the event were not continued and as per regulation the Top 4 were given the same point (excluding Tanso point) and the winner is given to the highest     quailifier

References

External links 
 Official Website (In Japanese)

D1 Grand Prix seasons
D1 Grand Prix